Mathew Sagwe  (born 2 July 1988) is a Kenyan track and field athlete who competes in the high jump.

In 2014 he competed at the 2014 African Championships in Athletics and 2014 Commonwealth Games without reaching the podium.

His breakthrough came in 2015, when he won the 2015 national trials with a national record height. A jump of  brought him the gold at the 2016 African Championships in Athletics. This made him the first Kenyan to win that title.

International competitions

National titles

Kenyan Athletics Championships
High jump: 2015

References

External links

Living people
1988 births
Kenyan male high jumpers
Commonwealth Games competitors for Kenya
Athletes (track and field) at the 2014 Commonwealth Games
Athletes (track and field) at the 2018 Commonwealth Games
Athletes (track and field) at the 2015 African Games
Athletes (track and field) at the 2019 African Games
Athletes (track and field) at the 2020 Summer Olympics
African Games silver medalists for Kenya
African Championships in Athletics winners
African Games medalists in athletics (track and field)
Olympic athletes of Kenya